1. Fussball-Club Schweinfurt 1905, Verein für Leibesübungen e.V., called 1. FC Schweinfurt 05,  Schweinfurt 05, or simply FC 05, is a German association football club established in Schweinfurt (Bavaria) in 1905. It has sections for netball, fistball, field hockey, badminton, gymnastics, rugby, American football, futsal, and athletics.

The club is well known due to successful years in top and second-tier football leagues from the 1930s to the 1970s, and thanks to outstanding individuals. During the late 1930s, Schweinfurt's midfielders Albin Kitzinger and Andreas Kupfer, today considered as two of the best half-back players of all time, formed the core of the Germany national football team and represented their country at the 1938 FIFA World Cup and within the premiere FIFA continent selection Europe XI.

The FC 05 first team, which competes in the tier-four Regionalliga Bayern since the 2013–14 season, is organized within 1. FC Schweinfurt 1905 Fußball GmbH. The club plays its home games at Sachs-Stadion in Schweinfurt.

History

Early years: 1905–1931

At a time when football became more and more popular among broad levels of the population, 1. Fussball-Club Schweinfurt 1905 was founded on 5 May 1905 by a group of sports enthusiasts. The club's first chairman, Pepi Popp, designed the still unchanged FC 05 crest.

The new team played in various local leagues until beginning of the First World War. The home games were held at Hutrasen south of river Main, the later venue of local competitor VfR 07 Schweinfurt. In 1919, Schweinfurt 05 had to move to a new court near Ludwigsbrücke and became member of the tier-one Kreisliga Nordbayern, but relegated after its first season. The team attempted a merger with Turngemeinde Schweinfurt von 1848, which lasted from 1921 to 1923, before the two groups parted ways again and the football division became 1. Fussball-Club Schweinfurt 1905, Verein für Leibesübungen e.V.

While FC 05 did not reap the expected benefits from the brief union, it improved dramatically after re-establishing itself as an independent club. Membership grew significantly and a number of new sports departments were formed within the organization. The football team yielded its first fruits in 1927 by winning the Unterfranken Cup championship, and in 1931, when it became Kreisliga Unterfranken champion.

Years of excellence: 1931–1963
Schweinfurt 05 finally gained first class status again with its entry into the Bezirksliga Bayern in 1931. 
After introduction of the Gauliga system in 1933, the club became member of the top-flight Gauliga Bayern thanks to finishing 3rd in Bezirksliga Bayern Nord.
In addition, the team succeeded in winning the 1933 Bavarian Cup championship, but lost 1–2 to VfB Stuttgart in the subsequent Southern German Cup final.

The club experienced an era of successful seasons in the Gauliga years, winning the Gauliga Bayern in 1939 and 1942, and qualifying for the German football championship round. 
In the German football championship 1939 competition, Schweinfurt barely missed the semi-final qualification games after three wins in the group stage, where it defeated later 1943 and 1944 German champion Dresdner SC 1–0 in the first leg, but then lost to Dresden 0–1 in the decisive away match.
The team failed in the round of 16 of the 1942 German football championship after a 1–2 loss to SG SS Straßburg.

Schweinfurt made a semi-final appearance in the 1936 Tschammerpokal, when it was defeated 2–3 by FC Schalke 04, the closest it ever came to winning a national title. Again in 1936, the club moved into its newly constructed stadium, the Willy-Sachs-Stadion (today: Sachs-Stadion), a donation by local industrialist and patron Willy Sachs.

At that time, FC 05 midfielders Albin Kitzinger and Andreas 'Ander' Kupfer became renowned in international football as they formed one of the best half-back duos in Europe. 
Kitzinger distinguished himself with assuredness on the ball and the calmness in which he distributed the ball.
Kupfer was a player that fascinated the crowds with his elegant ways of playing. He was a master of kicking the ball with just moving his ankle joint.
Kitzinger and Kupfer were an essential part of the famous Germany national team who defeated Denmark 8–0 in Breslau on 16 May 1937. One year later they competed at the 1938 FIFA World Cup in France, and were both called up to represent Germany within the FIFA selection Europe XI in the FA 75th anniversary game against England at Highbury in London.

Due to the Second World War, Schweinfurt 05 merged with Luftwaffen SV Schweinfurt into KSG Schweinfurt for the 1943–44 and 1944–45 Gauliga seasons. The club temporarily had been dissolved in May 1945 under pressure from the occupying powers.

After World War II, the re-established 1. FC Schweinfurt 05 was integrated into the tier-one Oberliga Süd, which, for the first time in German football, introduced the system of contract players in August 1948.  
The club stayed in the Oberliga for the duration of the league's existence until the Bundesliga, Germany's new professional league, was founded in 1963. 
Schweinfurt reached the round of the last sixteen of the 1954–55 DFB-Pokal, where it lost 0–1 in the replay against FC Schalke 04 after a 1–1 draw in the first match.
On the occasion of the club's 50th anniversary in 1955, Schweinfurt could demonstrate its level when the team defeated German champion Rot-Weiss Essen 3–1, and achieved a 1–1 draw against Everton F.C. from English Football League First Division.
The club made it into the 1957 and 1958 Southern German Cup finals and lost both times, to FC Bayern München and to VfB Stuttgart, respectively.

In 1950, Andreas Kupfer became the first captain of the West Germany national football team in his very final 44th appearance. FC 05 goalkeeper Günter Bernard earned two West Germany caps in 1962, before he joined Bundesliga founding member SV Werder Bremen one year later, and was named in Germany's squad for the 1966 FIFA World Cup.

Second tier years: 1963–1976
1. FC Schweinfurt 05 was one of 46 West German football clubs that applied for admission to the newly established Bundesliga in 1963. However, based on the Oberliga Süd score of its past 12 seasons, the club finally did not qualify for the new league, and thus found itself playing in the second tier Regionalliga Süd. 

In the 1965–66 season, Schweinfurt became Southern German Regionalliga champion and made it to the Bundesliga advancement games. Here, the team missed to ascend to the top tier after it was unable to prevail in its qualification group with 1. FC Saarbrücken, FC St. Pauli, and promoted winner Rot-Weiss Essen.

With the introduction of the 2. Bundesliga in 1974, Schweinfurt was founding member of the southern division despite only finishing 15th in the last Regionalliga year. For its first 2. Bundesliga season in 1974–75, the club signed-up former national team striker and Bundesliga top scorer Lothar Emmerich. The team earned an excellent third place and barely missed the advancement games for promotion to Bundesliga.

Yo-yo years: 1976–2016

After the 1974–75 season, FC 05 began to falter: poor results and financial problems saw the club descend first to the Bayernliga (III) and then, for the first time in 1983, to the Landesliga Bayern-Nord (IV). 
Schweinfurt 05 became a yo-yo club ascending and descending between tiers III and IV, with just a pair of brief 2. Bundesliga appearances in 1990–91 and in 2001–02.

As 1989–90 Bayernliga champion the club prevailed in the advancement games to 2. Bundesliga, but was not able to keep pace in the new league.
The year before, the team had made it into the last sixteen of the 1989–90 DFB-Pokal, where it lost 0–2 to Eintracht Braunschweig.
In 2001, Schweinfurt was promoted to 2. Bundesliga after finishing 3rd in Regionalliga Süd. 
The team's third place finish was enough to let them skip past the amateur side of VfB Suttgart, who were not allowed to advance a second side to the professional ranks. 
Despite a decent first half of the tier-two season, FC 05 finally could not avoid relegation after one year.

Disasters happened in 2004 when FC Schweinfurt 05 was forced to leave the Regionalliga Süd (III) because of financial reasons, and in 2005 when the club went bankrupt. The results in the Bayernliga (IV) were annulled, and the team was relegated to the fifth tier Landesliga.

A re-structured club successfully worked its way back into Bayernliga in 2007. After it was relegated again to the now tier-six Landesliga in 2009, the team returned to the Bayernliga immediately the following year. At the end of the 2011–12 season Schweinfurt managed to qualify for the promotion round to the new Regionalliga Bayern (IV) and advanced to the second round, where the team missed out on promotion.
The club finally earned direct promotion to tier-four Regionalliga Bayern in the 2012–13 season by taking the championship in the Bayernliga northern division.
Schweinfurt's first three Regionalliga years, however, were characterized by a permanent but successful struggle against relegation.

Recent years: 2016–today

In 2016, the FC 05 first team was spun off into 1. FC Schweinfurt 1905 Fußball GmbH. By means of the reorganization, the club again established professional structures that shall pave the way back to higher leagues.

Schweinfurt actually experienced an upturn in the 2016–17 season and finished 8th in Regionalliga Bayern. In addition, the team succeeded in winning the Bavarian Cup after a 1–0 victory over SV Wacker Burghausen in the final. 
In the 2017–18 Regionalliga, Schweinfurt's ambitioned team was not able to jeopardize the championship of TSV 1860 München, and finally finished 3rd.
1. FC Schweinfurt 05 defeated 2. Bundesliga club SV Sandhausen 2–1 in the 2017–18 DFB-Pokal first round, but then lost 0–4 to later cup winner SG Eintracht Frankfurt.
In the same season, Schweinfurt 05 successfully defended the Bavarian Cup after a 3–1 victory over league competitor SpVgg Bayreuth in the final.
Despite the objective of the 2018–19 Regionalliga championship and promotion to 3. Liga, Schweinfurt clearly missed this chance and finished 4th end of the season.
In the 2018–19 DFB-Pokal first round, the team lost 0–2 to previous season's  Bundesliga runner-up and 2018–19 UEFA Champions League competitor FC Schalke 04.

Due to the COVID-19 pandemic in Germany, the original 2019–20 Regionalliga Bayern season was extended until spring 2021, and the 2020–21 season has been cancelled. 
In July 2020, the current league leader Türkgücü München was promoted to the 3. Liga, whereas runners-up FC Schweinfurt 05 qualified for the 2020–21 DFB-Pokal. 
In the first round cup match, Schweinfurt was defeated 1–4, again by Bundesliga club FC Schalke 04. 
1. FC Schweinfurt 05 managed to win the long-desired championship of the finally discontinued 2019–21 Regionalliga Bayern when the club prevailed in a play-off group of the top three eligible teams with Viktoria Aschaffenburg and SpVgg Bayreuth.
However, Regionalliga champion Schweinfurt missed out on promotion to the 3. Liga after a 0–2 on aggregate in the play-offs against TSV Havelse from Regionalliga Nord. In the following 2021–22 Regionalliga Bayern season the team finished 5th.

Honours

League
 German football championship
 Last sixteen: 1942
 Oberliga Süd (I)
 Third: 1954–55
 Gauliga Bayern (I)
 Champions: (2) 1938–39, 1941–42
 Runners-up: (2) 1936–37, 1942–43†
 2. Bundesliga Süd (II)
 Third: 1974–75
 Regionalliga Süd (II)* (III)**
 Champions: 1965–66*
 Third: 2000–01**‡
 Bayernliga (III)* (IV)**
 Champions: (2) 1989–90*‡, 1997–98**
 Runners-up: (2) 1981–82*, 1988–89*
 Regionalliga Bayern (IV)
 Champions: 2019–21
 Bayernliga Nord (V)
 Champions: 2012–13
 Landesliga Bayern-Nord (IV)* (V)** (VI)***
 Champions: (3) 1983–84*, 1985–86*, 2006–07**
 Runners-up: 2009–10***
 Landesliga Bayern-Nordwest (VI)
 Champions: 2016–17#

Cup
 German Cup/DFB-Pokal
 Semi-finals: 1936
 Last sixteen: (2) 1954–55, 1989–90
 Southern German Cup
  Runners-up: (3) 1933, 1957, 1958
 Bavarian Cup
 Winners: (3) 1933, 2016–17, 2017–18
 Unterfranken Cup
 Winners: (5) 1927, 1963#, 1996, 2006, 2009

Youth
 Bavarian Under 19 championship
 Winners: 2001
 Runners-up: (4) 1961, 1966, 1968, 2021
 Bavarian Under 17 championship
 Winners: 2005
 Runners-up: 1995
 Bavarian Under 15 championship
 Winners: 2003
 Runners-up: (2) 1986, 1994

† Northern division  ‡ Promoted to 2. Bundesliga  # Reserve team

Seasons

First team
The season-by-season performance of the club from 1931 until today:

 The 1944–45 Gauliga Bayern season operated in five regional divisions. It is unknown whether any of the season's games were played in the Lower Franconia (German: Unterfranken) division.
 With the introduction of the Bezirksoberligas in 1988 as the new fifth tier, below the Landesligas, all leagues below dropped one tier. With the introduction of the Regionalligas in 1994 and the 3. Liga in 2008 as the new third tier, below the 2. Bundesliga, all leagues below dropped one tier. With the establishment of the Regionalliga Bayern as the new fourth tier in Bavaria in 2012 the Bayernliga was split into a northern and a southern division, the number of Landesligas expanded from three to five and the Bezirksoberligas were abolished. All leagues from the Bezirksligas onward were elevated one tier.
 The 2020–21 Regionalliga Bayern season has been cancelled due to the COVID-19 pandemic in Germany, and the original 2019–20 season was extended until spring 2021. In July 2020, the current league leader Türkgücü München was promoted to the 3. Liga and thus suspended from 2019–21 Regionalliga Bayern, and the club's league results have all been annulled. The 2019–21 Regionalliga Bayern champion and participant in the promotion play-offs against the champions of the 2020–21 Regionalliga Nord was determined end of the discontinued season in a double round-robin play-off series with the top three eligible teams Viktoria Aschaffenburg, SpVgg Bayreuth, and 1. FC Schweinfurt 05.

Reserve team
The recent season-by-season performance of the U23 reserve. After the 2017−18 season, the team had been pulled out from future league participation.

Key

German football championship appearances
The club's appearances in German football championship competitions:

* Dresdner SC finished top of the group, level on points with Schweinfurt, due to better scoring

DFB-Pokal appearances
The club's appearances in Tschammerpokal (until 1943) and DFB-Pokal:

* Originally scheduled on 22 August 1943, but adjourned after the allied air-raid on Schweinfurt on 17 August 1943  
† Replay  
‡ Eintracht Frankfurt won 6–2 on aggregate  
# Originally scheduled on 13 September 2020, but postponed after a legal challenge of Türkgücü München regarding the spot allocated to the representative of the Regionalliga Bayern. Due to the impact of the COVID-19 pandemic in Germany and the organisational effort required to host the fixture, Schweinfurt's home leg was held at Veltins-Arena in Gelsenkirchen, and without spectators

Stadium

Early grounds
In its first years, 1. FC Schweinfurt 05 played the home games at Hutrasen, the later ground of local competitor VfR 07 Schweinfurt. After the First World War, the club had to move to a court in close proximity, located at Ludwigsbrücke in Schweinfurt. With promotion to Gauliga Bayern in 1933, however, the existing venue proved to be more and more inadequate.

Sachs-Stadion

The club's necessity finally motivated local industrialist Willy Sachs to the donation of a football stadium to the City of Schweinfurt, where the patron designated a privileged right of use for FC Schweinfurt 05. The new Willy-Sachs-Stadion, built by German architect Paul Bonatz, was opened on 23 July 1936 in the presence of leading politicians of the Third Reich. The stadium saw its first game three days later with a 2–2 draw between Schweinfurt 05 and 1935 German champion FC Schalke 04. Attandance record was 22,500 at a friendly between Schweinfurt 05 and 1. FC Kaiserslautern in 1954.

Today, the stadium has a capacity of 15,060, where the grandstand hosts 860 covered seats. Besides the football field, the stadium offers track and field facilities, and is equipped with a classical Marathon gate. Premises at the stadium include changing rooms for players, coaches, and referees. Speaker cabins and a press area are available in the grandstand.

The stadium has been renovated and equipped with floodlights in 2001 in order to meet the requirements for 2. Bundesliga. In addition, an electronic scoreboard was contributed by Schweinfurt's large industry. Wavebreakers have been installed on the standing rooms in 2014 to safeguard the stadium's full capacity.

The stadium is listed as historic monument and is thus subject to preservation orders.
As a consequence of Willy Sachs' Nazi affiliation, in June 2021 the Schweinfurt city council decided to rename the sports venue into Sachs-Stadion, in recognition of the value of the former Fichtel & Sachs company for the development of Schweinfurt.

Proposed new stadium
Due to the club's ambitions to promote again to professional leagues with stricter legislations on stadium capacity and equipment,
the city administration commissioned a feasibility study for a new stadium to be realised in Schweinfurt.  
Two locations for a football arena with a capacity of 15,000 have been proposed by the German architectural office AS+P, one at former U.S. Conn Barracks, the other close to the existing venue.

Players

Current squad

Notable past players
  Albin Kitzinger (MF)
  Andreas Kupfer (MF)
  Robert Bernard (MF)
  Günter Bernard (GK)
  Lothar Emmerich (FW)
  Erwin Albert (FW)
  Michael Glowatzky (FW)
  Sebastian Kneißl (MF)
  Florian Trinks (MF)
  Daniel Adlung (MF)

International caps
Germany national football team (Caps/Goals):
  Albin Kitzinger: 44/2
  Andreas Kupfer: 44/1
  Günter Bernard: 2/0 (3 additional caps for SV Werder Bremen)
Europe XI (Caps/Goals):
  Albin Kitzinger: 1/0
  Andreas Kupfer: 1/0

Non-playing staff

Current management team

Managerial history
Head coaches of the club from 1929:

Supporters and rivalries
The supporters of Schweinfurt 05 maintain a traditional friendship with the fans of Würzburger FV. They have a distinct hostility with fans of Würzburger FV's local rival FC Würzburger Kickers.

References

External links

Official club site
The Abseits Guide to German Soccer
1. FC Schweinfurt 05 profile at Weltfussball.de
Football in Bavaria at FuPa.net
Football results at kicker.de
Fan site (Kugellagerstadt.com)

 
Association football clubs established in 1905
Football clubs in Germany
Football clubs in Bavaria
Football in Lower Franconia
German rugby union clubs
1905 establishments in Germany
Schweinfurt
2. Bundesliga clubs